Cape Serrat is a cape situated in western Bizerte Governorate in northwest Tunisia. The cape is located between the cities of Sejnane and Tabarka.

References

Serrat